Series 5 of the ITV programme Foyle's War was first aired in 2008; comprising three episodes, it is set in the period from April 1944 to May 1945.

Episodes

"Plan of Attack"

Cast and characters
Foyle has been in retirement after his resignation a year earlier at the end of "Casualties of War". Stewart has been removed as a police driver by Foyle's replacement, Meredith, and has been working as a librarian in the Air Ministry's cartography facility at Beverley Lodge for the last six months. She is also assisting Foyle as his typist his book on the Hastings Constabulary during the war (even though she is not a proficient typist). In addition, her uncle Aubrey Stewart (Brian Poyser), a priest, returns from the episode "The French Drop", when he visits Hastings for the ecumenical conference. Milner, unhappy since Foyle's departure, seeks the latter's counsel after finding Meredith difficult to work with and considers leaving Hastings. However, by the end of the episode, the original team is reunited when Foyle and Milner both decide to stay, and Stewart quits to rejoin them.

Background and production
The episode mentions increased troop movements down to the south coast and that "the end of the war is in sight", indicating a pre-D Day setting. The cartography activity at fictitious Beverly Lodge (filmed at Langley Park, Slough, Berkshire) is based on the secret map-making activities undertaken at Hughenden Manor during World War II, which were not known until two years before the shooting of this episode. Anthony Horowitz based much of the story on the experiences of Victor Gregory, a cartographer at Hughenden, who was engaged as a consultant during the shooting of the episode. Another theme is various efforts by the Church of England to preach forgiveness of the enemy, establish relations with the German church (such as the German Confessing Church), and accept from Germany a conditional (rather than unconditional) surrender to prevent the unnecessary killing of innocent civilians by indiscriminate bombing of German cities. The efforts of Dietrich Bonhoeffer are mentioned, as are events reflecting the real-life George Bell, Bishop of Chichester.

"Broken Souls"

Cast and characters
Novak was in Paris during the invasion of Poland, and his wife and daughter remained there. During the episode, we learn of their transfer to a ghetto (probably the Lublin Ghetto), and then to the Majdanek concentration camp, news of which triggers Novak's suicide attempt. Further, his uncle was apparently a Polish chess grandmaster. Dawson had been a prisoner since the Battle of Dunkirk, four years earlier, but recently escaped and is suffering from frostbite. Tommy Crooks, a 15-year-old missing former child-evacuee, arrives to stay with Sir John and Lady Muriel Sackville, the gentry who had lived in the newly converted hospital and whose son was killed in the 1942 raid on Dieppe. As a telegram boy, Crooks was traumatised by the reactions of those to whom he delivered bad news and also the recent death of his mother in a V-1 flying bomb attack. His father, Morris, arrives in Hastings seeking his return.

Background and production
German POWs are being billeted near Hastings at the Bexhill-on-Sea POW Camp. At the Ruby Cinema, the 1944 film Going My Way, starring Bing Crosby, is being screened, along with a Pathé News newsreel. The radio news report heard by Novak was by BBC correspondent Alexander Werth. Also, Brooke discusses a staff football betting pool at the station, in which they win £100, which Foyle suggests donating to Jewish refugees. The fictional article in the episode is in the October 1944 issue of The Journal of Mental Science, titled The Mental Trauma of War: Some Case Studies and published by the Royal Medico-Psychological Association. Foyle is also seen looking through newspapers dated 14 October 1944, including Daily Mirror, Daily Express, and The Daily Telegraph.

"All Clear"

Cast and characters
Kieffer (from Series 4 "Invasion") returns in this episode, and we learn of his wife and two children. Also returning are Foyle's son, who had been flying in Malta prior to his discharge, and Pierce (from Series 2 "War Games" and Series 3 "The French Drop"). With the war in Europe winding down, Foyle is retiring again and the station is being moved to another location. Milner received a promotion to DI and a transfer to Brighton, while Edith, his new wife, is expecting their first child, a daughter. When the delivery starts, Foyle gets behind the wheel and drives them to the hospital. Stewart is uneasy about her post-war career, and Foyle suggests volunteering with the military charity SSAFA. Andrew Foyle attempts to apologise and propose to Stewart and rekindle their friendship and romance.

Background and production
A major plotline is the Slapton Sands disaster and its subsequent secrecy. Others include the ongoing preparations for the celebration of VE Day in Hastings (including profiteering from the sale of flags and bunting) and the difficulties experienced by returning servicemen in adapting to civilian life. One inconsistency is that Andrew says he won't continue as a pilot because "sinusitis has affected my vision", but sinusitis, while a reason for temporary grounding because of the pain caused by unpressurised cockpits, extremely rarely affects vision permanently. Several newspapers are used as props: Foyle is seen reading a copy of The Hastings Chronicle with a "Hitler Dead" headline; a few days later, a child reads The Evening News stating "Germany Surrenders"; and, in the station, Brooke discusses a Jane comic from the Daily Mirror. The episode ends with Churchill's victory speech and It's a Lovely Day Tomorrow, sung by Vera Lynn.

International broadcast
Series Five was broadcast in the United States on PBS stations on Masterpiece Mystery! as Foyle's War V on 7 and 14 June 2009, and on Netflix as of April 2014.

References

External links
 Series 5 on IMDb

Fiction set in 1944
Fiction set in 1945
Foyle's War episodes
2008 British television seasons